The 5th FINA World Swimming Championships (25 m) were held at the Olympic Aquatic Centre in Athens, Greece from 16–19 March 2000. 15 world records were set.

Men's events

Legend: WR: World record; CR: World Championships record

Women's events

Legend: WR: World record; CR: World Championships record

Medal table

References
 HistoFINA Men
 HistoFINA Women

 
FINA World Swimming Championships (25 m)
FINA World Championship
Swimming
S
Sports competitions in Athens
Swimming in Greece
March 2000 sports events in Europe
2000s in Athens